Minuscule 408 (in the Gregory-Aland numbering), ε 231 (in Soden's numbering), is a Greek minuscule manuscript of the New Testament, on parchment. Palaeographically it has been assigned to the 12th century. 
It has marginalia.

Description 

The codex contains a complete text of the four Gospels on 261 parchment leaves. The text is written in one column per page, in 22 lines per page. Text of Matthew 1:1-13 was added by a later hand.

There is also a division according to the smaller Ammonian Sections (in Mark 234 Sections), whose numbers are given at the margin with references to the Eusebian Canons (written below Ammonian Section numbers).

Synaxarion and Menologion were added on paper.

Text 

The Greek text of the codex is a representative of the Byzantine text-type. Hermann von Soden classified it to the textual family K1. Aland placed it in Category V.

According to the Claremont Profile Method it represents textual family Kx in Luke 1, Luke 10, and Luke 20.

History 

Formerly the manuscript was held in the Chrysostomus monastery, near Jordan, as stated in a note of the original scribe. Wiedmann and J. G. J. Braun collated portions of the manuscript for Scholz (1794–1852). The manuscript was added to the list of New Testament manuscripts by Scholz.
C. R. Gregory saw it in 1886.

The manuscript is currently housed at the Biblioteca Marciana (Gr. I. 14) in Venice.

See also 

 List of New Testament minuscules
 Biblical manuscript
 Textual criticism

References

Further reading 

 

Greek New Testament minuscules
12th-century biblical manuscripts